The 2017–18 season is the 71st season in NK Osijek's history and their 27th in the Prva HNL.

Season review

Kit information
Supplier: Nike, Inc. / 
Sponsor: Osječko 1664

First-team squad

Out on loan

Matches

HT Prva liga

Croatian Cup

UEFA Europa League

Player seasonal records
Updated 28 October 2017. Competitive matches only.

Goals

Source: Competitive matches

Clean sheets

Source: Competitive matches

Disciplinary record

References

NK Osijek seasons
Osijek